Loi Leng is the highest mountain of the Shan Hills. It is located in Shan State, Burma,  to the southeast of Lashio.

Geography

See also
List of mountains in Burma
List of Ultras of Southeast Asia

References

External links
Google Books, The Physical Geography of Southeast Asia
Peakbagger - Shan-Western Thailand

Geography of Shan State
Mountains of Myanmar
Shan Hills